Koçköy is a small belde (town) in Arpaçay district of Kars Province, Turkey. The population of the town is 1213 as of 2011. The town was founded during the 19th century by Turks who escaped from The Russian armies during the Russo-Turkish War (1828-1829) and Russo-Turkish War (1853-1856) (Crimean War). The name of the town ("aries village") probably refers to an early totem.

References

Populated places in Kars Province
Towns in Turkey
Arpaçay District